Albert Henry Payne (14 December 1812 in London – 7 May 1902 in Leipzig) was a steel engraver, painter and illustrator. He was English, but lived in Leipzig from 1839 onward.

References

External links 

English engravers
English illustrators
19th-century English painters
English male painters
German engravers
German illustrators
19th-century German painters
German male painters
1812 births
1902 deaths
19th-century German male artists
English emigrants to Germany
19th-century English male artists